The Emirates Investment Authority (EIA) is the only sovereign wealth fund of the federal government of the United Arab Emirates. It was established in 2007, the EIA has actively sought unique investment opportunities locally, regionally and internationally, focussing on investing in asset classes considered to help strengthen and diversify the UAE economy.

Investments
The EIA made two investments when it acquired major holdings in two Middle Eastern and North African telecommunications companies, Etisalat and du. Further investments are known to have been made in Gulf International Bank in Bahrain, the United Arab Shipping Company,  and the Gulf Investment Corporation. In total, the EIA has acquired over 30 stakes in corporations across the GCC.

Board Members
Sheikh Mansour bin Zayed Al Nahyan, Deputy Prime Minister and Minister of Presidential Affairs
 Mohammad Abdulla Al Gergawi – Deputy Chairman and Minister of Cabinet Affairs
 Sultan Bin Saeed Al Mansouri – Member and Minister of Economy
 Obaid Humaid Al Tayer – Member and Minister of State for Financial Affairs
 Abdul Hamid Mohammed Saeed – Member and Managing Director of First Gulf Bank
 Eissa Mohamed Al Suwaidi – Member and Executive Director of the Abu Dhabi Investment Council
 Kaltham Hamad Balabad Al Ghafli -  Investment Manager in the External Equities Department in Abu Dhabi Investment Authority

References

External links
 Official website

Finance in the United Arab Emirates
Investment promotion agencies
Government agencies of the United Arab Emirates